The Dr. Emilio B. Espinosa Sr. Memorial State College of Agriculture and Technology (DEBESMSCAT) is the lone state college in the province of Masbate. Its main campus is located at Cabitan, Mandaon, Masbate while its off campus learning site is located at Cawayan, Masbate.

History

It was first called the Masbate National Agricultural School and was established on November 15, 1952, by virtue of R.A. No. 605, authored by Dr. Emilio B. Espinosa Sr., then the lone congressman of the province of Masbate. MNAS was renamed Masbate Agricultural College on June 18, 1966, by virtue of R.A. No. 4717, authored by then-congressman and con-con delegate, Hon. Andres R. Clemente Jr.

MAC was renamed the Dr. Emilio B. Espinosa Sr. Memorial Agricultural College on July 30, 1977, upon approval by Pres. Ferdinand E. Marcos of Resolution No. 136, series of 1976 enacted by the Sangguniang Panlalawigan of Masbate on December 8, 1976.

Republic Act No. 7945 approved March 3, 1995, authored by Masbate’s Second Congressional District Representative the Honorable Luz Cleta Reyes - Bakunawa and approved by President Fidel V. Ramos, converted the DEBESMAC into the Dr. Emilio B. Espinosa Sr. Memorial State College of Agriculture and Technology with Dr. Percival V. Bartolata as its first president.

Pres. Bartolata was succeeded by Dr. Alfredo B. Atendido Sr., the acting president. On April 1, 2003, Dr. Magno S. Conag Jr. assumed his office as the second President. Under the leadership of Dr. Magno S. Conag Jr., the DEBESMSCAT continued to experience growth, particularly in the development of different curricular programs through accreditation.

After President Conag completed his two terms, Dr. Erwin H. Malto was elected by the Board of Trustees as the third President of DEBESMSCAT, granting him two terms from 2011 up to 2019. Under Dr. Malto's leadership, the state college became ISO-certified (ISO 9001:2008 - Quality Management System). A mock audit of the QMS consultant was conducted on October 27–28, 2015 and November 5–6, 2015. Internal audit followed on November 18–20, 2015. Stage 1 audit was conducted on February 11–12, 2016. On April 18–19, 2016, a Stage 2 audit was held. And on June 11, 2016, the most sought certification was given to the DEBESMSCAT by AJA (Anglo-Japanese-American) Registrars and the internal QMS auditor. 

By virtue of Republic Act No. 11171, DEBESMSCAT was converted into Dr. Emilio B. Espinosa Sr. - Masbate State University (DEBESMSU).

On May 14, 2019, Dr. Renee A. Lamela, former Vice President for Academic Affairs, was elected as the fourth SUC President and the first woman to have been elected in the office. Dr. Lamela's leadership seeks to capture the full compliance of the CHED requirements for the university status and initially implement RA 11171 otherwise known as DEBESMSU.

Facilities

The 3,668-hectare campus of mostly rolling terrain is in the municipality of Mandaon 56.5 kilometers from the provincial capital, Masbate City.

The school provides dormitories to students and runs a hostel for visitors.  The majority of students opt to construct their own cottages in areas designated as student villages or reside in private boarding houses.

Support is provided to the students through the three offices of the Office of Student Affairs: Guidance, Undergraduate Scholarship, Students' Organization, and Activities. A large portion of the student population regularly avails of externally funded and institutional scholarships awarded yearly.  Student loans are likewise administered and student assistants are hired by the school, earning P25 per hour.  Student housing is coordinated by the Director of Auxiliary Services.

The school library houses over 100,000 volumes of books and provides Internet services.

DEBESMSCAT has a sports program headed by a sports coordinator. The school runs regular PE classes, annual intramurals, and an active sports club, and sends athletes to compete in regional and national competitions.

The school maintains a clinic staffed by a licensed physician and nurses, with recourse to hospitals in Masbate City.

Religious denominations operate in the school, and there is a non-denominational ecumenical center.

The college used to operate DZEE 93.1  MHz FM, a 10-watt educational FM station licensed by the National Telecommunication Commission for DEBESMSCAT students and personnel, transmitting information, entertainment, and educational programs. In 2020, due to the pandemic, the school revived its radio station, now referred to as, 93.1 DEBESMSCAT Buffalo Radio Station. The radio was primarily operated for educational purposes such as the delivery of lessons to students amidst the challenges brought by the pandemic. 

The school also houses a 20-seat speech laboratory at the Institute of Arts and Sciences.

The DEBESMSCAT has laboratories in the academic institutes. The College of Arts and Sciences has laboratories in the basic sciences, and laboratories are focusing on specific fields.

Curricular offerings

As of October 2017, graduate and undergraduate programs offered by DEBESMSCAT are:
Doctor of Education in Educational Leadership (EdD EL)
Master of Arts in Education (MAEd)
Administration and Supervision
Mathematics Education
Science Education
English Language Education
Master of Science in Agriculture (MSA)
Animal Science and Crop Science
Bachelor of Science in Agriculture (BSA)
Agricultural Education
Agroforestry
Animal Science
Crop Science
Bachelor of Science in Agricultural Engineering (BSAEn)
Bachelor of Science in Animal Husbandry (BSAH)
Bachelor of Science in Industrial Technology (BSIT)
Automotive Technology
Electrical Technology
Civil Technology
Electronics Technology
Food Technology
Bachelor of Science in Civil Engineering (BSCE)
Bachelor of Science in Computer Science (BSCS)
Bachelor in Elementary Education (BEEd)
Preschool Education
General Education
Bachelor in Secondary Education (BSEd)
English
Mathematics
Biological Science
Filipino
Technology and Livelihood Education
Social Studies

Program accreditation

The curricular programs of the college are submitted for accreditation to the Accrediting Agency of Chartered Colleges and Universities in the Philippines (AACCUP), Inc. organized in 1987, though officially registered and recognized under the Securities and Exchange Commission (SEC) on September 4, 1989.

Academic units

Graduate School (GS)
Doctor of Education (EdD) Department
MAEd Department
College of Agriculture (CA)
BSA Department
BSAEn Department
College of Arts and Sciences (CAS)
BSCS Department
College of Technology (CT)
BSIT Department 
College of Education (CE)
Secondary Education Department
Elementary Education Department
Laboratory High School (transferred to Cabitan National High School)
DEBESMSCAT Preparatory School

References

Universities and colleges in Bicol Region
Universities and colleges in Masbate

id:Daftar universitas di Filipina
pam:Listaan da reng colegiu at universidad king Filipinas
zh:菲律宾大学列表